Jaka Ankerst (born March 27, 1989) is a Slovenian ice hockey player. He participated at the 2011 IIHF World Championship as a member of the Slovenia men's national ice hockey team.

References

External links

1989 births
Living people
HDD Jesenice players
HKMK Bled players
Diables Rouges de Briançon players
Gothiques d'Amiens players
LHC Les Lions players
HDK Maribor players
HDD Olimpija Ljubljana players
Slovenian ice hockey forwards
Sportspeople from Kranj
Slovenian expatriate sportspeople in France
Slovenian expatriate sportspeople in the United States
Slovenian expatriate ice hockey people
Expatriate ice hockey players in the United States
Expatriate ice hockey players in France
HK Acroni Jesenice players